Subsaximicrobium wynnwilliamsii is a bacterium from the genus of Subsaximicrobium.

References

External links
microbewiki

Flavobacteria
Bacteria described in 2005